The 2018–19 season was Villarreal Club de Fútbol's 96th season in existence and the club's 6th consecutive season in the top flight of Spanish football. In addition to the domestic league, Villarreal participated in this season's editions of the Copa del Rey and the UEFA Europa League. The season covered the period from 1 July 2018 to 30 June 2019.

Players

Reserve team

Out on loan

Transfers

In

Out

Competitions

Overall record

La Liga

League table

Results summary

Results by round

Matches

Copa del Rey

Round of 32

Round of 16

UEFA Europa League

Group stage

Knockout phase

Round of 32

Round of 16

Quarter-finals

Statistics

Appearances and goals
Last updated on 19 May 2019.

|-
! colspan=14 style=background:#dcdcdc; text-align:center|Goalkeepers

|-
! colspan=14 style=background:#dcdcdc; text-align:center|Defenders

|-
! colspan=14 style=background:#dcdcdc; text-align:center|Midfielders

|-
! colspan=14 style=background:#dcdcdc; text-align:center|Forwards

|-
! colspan=14 style=background:#dcdcdc; text-align:center| Players who have made an appearance or had a squad number this season but have left the club

|}

Goalscorers

References

Villarreal CF seasons
Villarreal
Villarreal